Metropolitan Boulevard may refer to: 

 Interstate 195 (Maryland), south of Baltimore to the Baltimore-Washington International Airport
 The elevated portion of Quebec Autoroute 40 in Montreal

See also
Metropolitan Parkway (disambiguation)